We Were Young is a 1961 Bulgarian drama film directed by Binka Zhelyazkova and written by Hristo Ganev. The film is centered on the Bulgarian resistance to Nazism in Sofia during the Second World War.

Cast
Dimitar Buynozov as Dimo
Rumyana Karabelova as Veska
Lyudmila Cheshmedzhieva as Tzveta
Georgi Georgiev-Getz as Mladen
Emilia Radeva as Nadya
Anani Yavashev as Slavcho
Georgi Naumov
Ivan Trifonov
Dimitar Panov
Ivan Bratanov
Dora Stoyanova

Release and acclaim
The film premiered on 13 March 1961 in Bulgaria. The film premiered in Russia in July 1962 at the 2nd Moscow International Film Festival and won the Golden Prize (1959–1967) for director Binka Zhelyazkova. Zhelyazkova was nominated as director of best picture at the Grand Prix Film Festival in 1961.

Box office
A reported 2,303,354 admissions were recorded for the film in cinemas throughout Bulgaria.

See also
List of Bulgarian films

References

External links
 

1961 films
1961 drama films
1960s Bulgarian-language films
Films directed by Binka Zhelyazkova
Bulgarian black-and-white films
Bulgarian drama films